The Caudron C.490 was a trainer aircraft built by Caudron in the mid 1930s.

Design
The C.490 was a biplane of all-wood construction with the airframe covered by canvas, derived from the Caudron C.159.

Specifications

References

Further reading

1930s French military trainer aircraft
C.490
Single-engined tractor aircraft
Aircraft first flown in 1935